American Prometheus: The Triumph and Tragedy of J. Robert Oppenheimer is a biography of J. Robert Oppenheimer by Kai Bird and Martin J. Sherwin. Twenty-five years in the making, the book was published in 2005 and was awarded the 2006 Pulitzer Prize for Biography or Autobiography. It also won the 2008 Duff Cooper Prize, Chicago Tribune Best Book of the Year, and Discover Magazine Best Science Book of the Year.

Background
The book was compiled and researched for two decades by Martin J. Sherwin before Kai Bird was brought on to put it together in a cohesive and readable format regarding the life and impact of J. Robert Oppenheimer.

The book's title refers to the legend of Prometheus, as mentioned in Scientific Monthly in September 1945:

Summary 
J. Robert Oppenheimer, often credited as the "father of the atomic bomb", was a physicist that had a significant role in the Manhattan Project as the project head and coordinator. The project eventually led to the creation of the nuclear atom bomb, a weapon of mass destruction. This bomb is regarded as a crucial turning point and a significant meeting between science and wartime weapons. This pivots Oppenheimer as not only an important historical figure but also as a symbol for atomic bomb ethics and political discourse about nuclear power. This book dives into various components of his life inside and outside the Manhattan Project. His early life, ambitions, ideas, relationships with other physicists, and impact are all discussed in this book.

Symbolic comparison 
Oppenheimer had voiced that he did not regret the overall making of the bomb, as Germany's nuclear ambitions during World War II had many countries concerned about the future actions of the country. There had been a much more pressing concern of Nazi Germany completing the German Nuclear Weapons Program before any of the other powers during the Second World War that the United States did not wish to risk.

Oppenheimer had certain known qualms about the Atom Bomb and the potential future usages of the bomb that could lead millions of people to their deaths. He and other scientists had voiced their concern and disagreement of the usage of the bomb in Nagasaki, Japan, finding that it had been a needless choice. Prometheus, the Greek mythology titan god of fire, is famously known as a figure symbolizing eternal repentance for stealing fire from Zeus to give to mankind. The titan had done so in order to save this wave of mankind that had already collapsed twice before due to war and famine. This book uses this comparison to elicit the weight of the nuclear weapon that Oppenheimer carried for the rest of his life.

Release

The May 2006 paperback edition consists of 721 pages, along with 32 pages of photographs. The first edition also has 721 pages.

Film adaptation

The book is set to be adapted into the 2023 biographical film Oppenheimer, by filmmaker Christopher Nolan.

References

External links
Presentation by Bird and Sherwin on American Prometheus, September 30, 2006, C-SPAN

American biographies
2005 non-fiction books
Pulitzer Prize for Biography or Autobiography-winning works
Alfred A. Knopf books
J. Robert Oppenheimer
Books about the Manhattan Project